Longfeng is the pinyin romanization of various Chinese names. It may refer to:

 Longfeng District of Daqing, Heilongjiang
 Longfeng in Jiexiu Prefecture, Shanxi